Apodosis  may refer to:
Apodosis (linguistics), the main clause in a conditional sentence, expressing the logical consequent
In the liturgy of the Eastern Orthodox Church, the final day of an Afterfeast